Nightside Emanations is the fourth studio album by Behexen. The album was released through Debemur Morti Productions on 21 September 2012. Nightside Emanations features changes in the band's musical sound, this time incorporating more traditional death metal mixed with their traditional black metal sound.  In addition, the vocals have drastically changed, the high pitched shrieks heard on the early albums are completely replaced by lower deathlike growls. The track "We Burn With Serpent Fire" contains a guest guitar solo by former Behexen guitarist Gargantum.

Track listing

Personnel
Hoath Torog - vocals, lyrics
Shatraug - guitar
Wraath - guitar
Horns - drums

Additional personnel
Gargantum - guest guitars on "We Burn With Serpent Fire"
Christophe Szpajdel – logo

References

2012 albums
Behexen albums